Base Band 5, abbreviated as BB5, is the current mobile baseband generation implemented on Nokia mobile phones and the replacement for prior DCT (Digital Core Technology) generations.

This generation of Nokia phone basebands uses a new range of chipsets, bus systems and components as well as enhanced security mechanisms preventing manipulations of firmware and system configurations. The phones' system interface has changed over from previous generations to allow, for instance, flashing of the device via USB.

Unlocking 

The system is designed to prevent unlocking of certain key capabilities of the handsets (such as usable network or installation of unsigned operating system), which has not been approved by Nokia or the network. Just like the DCT-4 (DCT generation 4) locking system, the unlocking code is unique to each handset and not stored inside the handset, but a hash signature, calculated by a secret algorithm and the phone uses only part of it to verify the code. However, unlike earlier DCT-4 baseband, where it was possible to run custom code, the BB5 generations uses Texas Instrument processor with TrustZone, the unlock code hash checking is implemented into special PA_xx applet, executed by the CPU in protected mode. The idea behind this approach is that will not be possible to patch the simlock applet and fooling the phone of accepting wrong code.

In May 2007, an engineer named Dejan Kaljevic from Serbia (who earned his fame from the free DCT-3 and DCT-4 unlocking solutions), has released a free program which can unlock many of the older Nokia BB5 phones such as the Nokia 6630, Nokia 6680, Nokia 6681 and the Nokia N70. There were reports for other models include the Nokia E60, Nokia E65, Nokia E70, Nokia N71, Nokia N90, Nokia N91, Nokia N93, but was deemed to be fake, since the unlocker only supports older BB5 models. This is easily done by the end-user through the phone's Pop-port connecting a legacy FBus compatible cable such as DKU-5, to a computer running his unlocking software package. Since then, commercial unlocking solutions have been offered by some others along with successful claims on some newer Nokia BB5 phones as well.

In July 2007, Kaljevic released the instructions and schematics to build a hardware solution for unlocking the Nokia N95. It was based on a CPLD logic IC and worked by manipulating CPU instructions on-the-fly, fooling the phone that a wrong unlock code was accepted like a correct one. However, it is not designed for end-users, since it requires advanced knowledge in electronics and soldering skills to accomplish.

In August 2008, Kaljevic released a full unlock box for newer BB5 handsets that doesn't require any soldering.

Since the release of the BB5 generation, although numerous hacks has been released that allowed unlocking as of 2014 it was not possible to load modified firmware into a BB5 phone.

Security Code 

In 2009, Nemesis Service Suite (NSS) had become a popular software package in order to unlock and extract information from certain BB5 phones. With the use of extra equipment, many BB5 phone could be unlocked using NSS. NSS had also been a popular way to generate a master-code (a code for bypassing Nokia's unlock screen) for BB5 phones.

The method of finding the master code was done by using connecting the BB5 Nokia phone via USB to a Windows Device running NSS.
NSS would then mine for phone information and produce a PM file, storing the master-code plus other phone related information within the file.

In 2008, Unlockitfree produced a sub site which steps through the NSS process for Windows users. The final step of the website is to upload the data dumped from NSS into Unlockitfree. If the steps were followed successfully, the server would parse the data dump file and identify the Security code for the device.

Notes

Nokia mobile phones
Hardware restrictions